Helaghareh (also Romanized as Helāghareh, Halāgharreh, and Halā Ghorreh; also known as Hilla Ghurreh) is a village in Karchambu-e Shomali Rural District, in the Central District of Buin va Miandasht County, Isfahan Province, Iran. At the 2006 census, its population was 154, in 44 families.

References 

Populated places in Buin va Miandasht County